Doghouse Records is an American record label currently based in New York City. The company was founded by Dirk Hemsath in late 1987 while living in Toledo, Ohio, in order to release the recordings of his hardcore band, Majority of One. The label originally specialized in midwest emo and melodic hardcore, though it eventually incorporated punk rock, pop punk, indie rock and alternative rock artists. 

Doghouse Records was originally distributed through Lumberjack Distribution (also owned by Hemsath), then through the conglomerate Lumberjack Mordam Music Group (once Hemsath bought out Mordam), the latter of which signed a distribution deal with WEA in November 2004, which became effective on January 1, 2005. As part of the WAE deal, Hemsath negotiated an "upstream" clause to promote and develop select Doghouse Records bands to major record label Warner Music Group; as such, and through a financial agreement between the two parties, Doghouse Records became an affiliate of Warner Music Group. Later in 2005, Doghouse Records relocated to New York City.

In 2005, the label released a Bob Dylan tribute album, featuring bands on its roster as well as artists such as P.O.S and Sparta vocalist Jim Ward.

Roster
This is a list of artists who have been signed by Doghouse Records.

A Lot Like Birds
The All-American Rejects
Another Day Late
Another Wall
Army of Me
As Friends Rust
Josh Berwanger
The Bigger Lights
Bloodline
The Break
Cable
Chamberlain
Celebrity
Coach
Colossus of the Fall
Contact
Cruiserweight 
Danger Radio 
Adam Dove
Eleven Eleven
Endpoint
Everyone Everywhere
Fabric
Face Value
Falling Forward
Favez
Feable Weiner
Fountainhead
Gameface
The Get Up Kids
Grown Ups
Hankshaw
The Honorary Title
Hot Water Music
Husking Bee
Into It. Over It.
Jet Lag Gemini
Joshua
Jowls
Koufax
Lazycain
Leftovers
Let It Burn
Lights
Limbeck
Majority of One
Mansions
Matt Pond PA
Meg & Dia
Metroschifter
Minutes Too Far
Mondo Primo
Moods for Moderns
Motion City Soundtrack
David Moore
My Hotel Year
Naked Angels
John Nolan
Ocean of Mercy
Omaha
Paulson
Push to Talk
Radar Mercury
Scott Ritcher
River City High
Romance on a Rocketship
The Sad Riders
Say Anything
Schatzi
Six Going On Seven
Split Lip
The Status
Stronghold
Sunday Driver
These Enzymes
Threadbare
Tramlaw
Transcend
Kurt Travis
Vineyard
Weatherbox
With the Punches
You, Me, and Everyone We Know
Young Statues

See also
Mordam Records

References

External links
 
 

1987 establishments in Ohio
Alternative rock record labels
American companies established in 2008
American independent record labels
Companies based in Toledo, Ohio
Doghouse Records
Hardcore record labels
Indie rock record labels
Post-hardcore record labels
Record labels based in Ohio
Record labels established in 1987
Rock record labels
Warner Music labels